Alberto Borin (17 March 1940 – 3 January 2023) was a Belgian teacher and politician of the Socialist Party (PS).

Biography
Borin earned a teaching degree from the Université libre de Bruxelles and briefly worked as a teacher. From 21 May 1995 to 5 May 1999, he represented the Arrondissement of Nivelles in the Chamber of Representatives.

Alberto Borin died in Nivelles on 3 January 2023, at the age of 82.

References

1940 births
2023 deaths
Members of the Senate (Belgium)
Members of the Chamber of Representatives (Belgium)
Socialist Party (Belgium) politicians
Université libre de Bruxelles alumni
People from Nivelles